"Me and My Drum" is a song by American-Swede rapper Swingfly featuring Christoffer Hiding and Beatrice Stars. The song was written by Teron Beal, Patrik Magnusson, Johan Ramström and Swingfly himself.

Swingfly (real name Ricardo DaSilva II), alongside Hiding and Stars performed it in the first semi-final of 4 semi-finals in Melodifestivalen 2011 on 5 February 2011 at the Coop Norrbotten Arena, Luleå coming second and proceeding to the finals on 12 March 2011 at the Globe Arena in Stockholm. He finished fifth overall.

The song was released one week before the final and proved popular making it to #10 in the Sverigetopplistan, the official Swedish Singles Chart and rising further up to #2. It was also certified platinum in Sweden.

Charts

References

Songs about drums
2011 singles
Swingfly songs
Melodifestivalen songs of 2011
Songs written by Teron Beal
2011 songs
EMI Records singles
Songs written by Johan Ramström
Songs written by Patrik Magnusson